A honky-tonk is a type of bar. The phrase may also refer to:

Films
Honky Tonk (1929 film), a musical drama starring Sophie Tucker
Honky Tonk (1941 film), a Western starring Clark Gable and Lana Turner
Honky Tonk (1974 film), a Western directed by Don Taylor

Music
Honky Tonk (album), 2013 album by Son Volt
Honky Tonk (Dude Mowrey album)
"Honky Tonk" (instrumental), a 1956 rhythm and blues instrumental
Honky tonk, the style of music played in a honky tonk, a subgenre of country music
Honky-tonk piano or tack piano, a piano modified to produce a more percussive sound 
"Honky Tonk", a track from the Miles Davis album The Cellar Door Sessions

See also
Honky Tonk Angel (disambiguation)
Honky Tonk Man (disambiguation)